The Geneva School is a private, classical, coeducational Christian day school, founded in 1993. The Geneva School is located on a 40-acre campus in Casselberry, FL.  Geneva is accredited by the Florida Council of Independent Schools. The total enrollment for 2022-2023 is about 660 students, K4–12.

Academics
Geneva employs a Christian classical education model. This trivium model of education consists of three distinct stages: grammar, dialectic, and rhetoric.

Grammar (Grades K4–6) makes use of a student's innate curiosity, inquisitiveness, and ability to absorb the basic material of a subject. Students learn such fundamentals as arithmetic tables, scientific formulas, biblical narratives, Latin paradigms, and cultural histories from Mesopotamia to our own time.

Dialectic (Grades 7–8) uses a student's natural inclination to question and analyze. In this investigative stage of learning, students acquire the tools of logic and critical thought to build the framework to ask meaningful questions and pursue deeper truths.

Rhetoric (Grades 9–12) teaches students how to communicate the grammar and dialectic disciplines effectively. Their confidence in how to think for themselves is built up by developing a capacity to present their views through speech and through writing.

Athletics
The Geneva School athletic teams are known as the Knights. The Knights are full members of FHSAA and compete at the 2A level in most sports. TGS also has an extensive youth sports program for grammar school students.

Building and expansion 
In the fall of 2019, The Geneva School upper school (7th–12th grade) moved into the new facility in Casselberry at the same location as the state-of-the-art outdoor athletic facility which opened in 2016. The new lower school (K4-6th grade) opened adjacent to the upper school in August of 2022, making it the largest dedicated private school campus in the Orlando metropolitan area.

References

External links
Official Website

1993 establishments in Florida
Buildings and structures in Winter Park, Florida
Christian schools in Florida
Classical Christian schools
Educational institutions established in 1993
High schools in Orange County, Florida
Private elementary schools in Florida
Private high schools in Florida
Private middle schools in Florida